Tauriainen is a Finnish surname. Notable people with the surname include:

Julius Tauriainen (born 2001), Finnish footballer
Kimmo Tauriainen (born 1972), Finnish footballer
Mika Tauriainen (born 1975), Finnish singer
Pasi Tauriainen (born 1964), Finnish footballer

Finnish-language surnames